Marcus Jacolby Maxey (born February 2, 1983 in Navasota, Texas) is a former American football defensive back.

Maxey was selected in the fifth round of the 2006 NFL Draft out of the University of Miami.  Maxey was waived by the Kansas City Chiefs earlier in the 2006 NFL season and spent a few weeks on the roster of the Chicago Bears before returning to the Chiefs later that season. The Chiefs released him on August 23, 2007.

1983 births
Living people
People from Navasota, Texas
Players of American football from Texas
American football cornerbacks
American football safeties
Miami Hurricanes football players
Kansas City Chiefs players